The 2009–10 Iona Gaels women's basketball team represented the Iona College in the 2009–10 NCAA Division I women's basketball season. The Gaels were  coached by Anthony Bozzella. The Gaels are a member of the Metro Atlantic Athletic Conference playing towards the NCAA championship. Jessica Anger was the Director of Basketball Operations.

Offseason
 August 12: Sophomore guard Jessica Scannell was named a member of the Irish Senior Women's basketball team for the European qualification series. Former Gael Michelle Fahy joined Scannell on the Irish squad.

Exhibition

Regular season

Roster

Schedule
The Gaels competed in the Iona Tip-Off Tournament (Arizona, Bucknell, Miami (OH)) from November 14–15. In addition, they competed in the Cancun Tournament November 26–27.

Player stats

Postseason

NCAA Basketball tournament

Awards and honors

Team players drafted into the WNBA

References

External links 
 Official site

Iona
Iona Gaels women's basketball